Ervin Y. Galantay (born Ervin Iván Galántay; 14 October 1930 – 30 October 2011) was a Hungarian-American architect. He married Karla Jay Noell (New York) in 1959. They had two sons Roy (born in 1961) and Richard (born in 1964). He lived most of his life in Cossonay, Switzerland, where he was a Professor Emeritus at the Ecole Polytechnique Fédérale de Lausanne.

Career
1955 dipl. arch, Eidgenössische Technische Hochschule Zürich (ETH Zürich); 
1957 Master of City Design; Philadelphia USA Lecturer Columbia University, New York 1959; 
Assistant Professor Harvard University 1961. Associate Professor Columbia University 1965, Professeur Ordinaire at the Swiss Federal Technical University EPFL. Dean of the Faculty; Director of the postgraduate Programs in Development Planning. Retired 1995.

Military affairs 
E. Galantay was a runner with the Vannay Battalion of volunteers in December 1944.  He is a Central Captain of the Knightly Order of Hungarian Warriors (Vitéz—valiant in English) and has been decorated with the golden medal of the Hungarian Institute of Military History. He has lectured about urban warfare (Military Operations Urban Terrain – MOUT) at the U. S. Army General Staff School at Fort Leavenworth and numerous other venues: at the British Army's War studies department and at the Conflict Studies Research Centre, Sandhurst and Shrivenham, as well as to Swiss and Hungarian military audiences.

Distinctions
Member of the prize-winning teams in the international competitions for the city Halls of Toronto and Boston. Member of the Design team of the Venezuelan New Town of Ciudad Guayana, and of Owerri, Nigeria. Master Plan of the campus of Stony Brook University Campus: Design of the Library. Humanities Building at Stony Brook L.I., as well, with DPW associates. of the Fine Arts Center and of the Music and Theatre buildings of Stony Brook University.

Publications 
articles in Architecture d'Aujourd'hui 1956. 
The Nation (N.Y) 
Progressive Architecture The Town Planning Review Hungarian Journal of Military History the Hungarian Quarterly

Books 
New Towns from the antiquity to the present Braziller New York, 1975.
Seven editions. – 
Nuevas ciudades : de la antigüedad a nuestros días Editorial Gustavo Gili: Barcelona and Buenos Aires 1977(also in Japanese and in Persian)
The Metropolis in Transition Paragon House, New York 1980 with A. Saqqaf et al." The Arabic City
New towns worldwide, International Federation for Housing and Planning, The Hague, the Netherlands 1985; editors, E.Y. Galantay, A.K. Constandse, T. Ohba.
Boy soldier, Budapest, 1944 – 1945 Militaria Publishers. 2nd edition 2006. Budapest 280 pages, 70 photos, 11 sketches, ten maps. Foreword by Lt.Gen. D. Petrosky of the US.Army,. See also C. Dick in the British Military Review, and L. Grau in the U.S. Military Review Febr. 2008.

Plays using the pseudonym Yan A. Galt: Selina, 1970, Stockwell Ltd UK. Ivanov/Evanson – a morality play 1971 Stockwell Ltd. UK

1930 births
2011 deaths
ETH Zurich alumni
Columbia University faculty
Harvard University faculty
Academic staff of the École Polytechnique Fédérale de Lausanne
Hungarian architects
Hungarian military personnel of World War II
20th-century American architects